American singer-songwriter Bob Dylan has released 39 studio albums, 95 singles, 18 notable extended plays, 54 music videos, 15 live albums, 17 volumes comprising The Bootleg Series, 29 compilation albums, 22 box sets, seven soundtracks as main contributor, thirteen music home videos and two non-music home videos.  Dylan has been the subject of seven documentaries, starred in three theatrical films, appeared in an additional eight films and 10 home videos, and is the subject of the semi-biographical tribute film I'm Not There.  He has written and published lyrics, artwork and memoirs in 11 books and three of his songs have been made into children's books.  He has done numerous collaborations, appearances and tribute albums.  The albums Planet Waves and Before the Flood were initially released on Asylum Records; reissues of those two and all others were on Columbia Records.

Dylan has won many awards for his songwriting and performances, including the 2016 Nobel Prize in Literature for his entire body of work. For a list of these accolades, see List of Bob Dylan awards. Much of his music has been bootlegged; for an examination of this phenomenon, see Bob Dylan bootleg recordings.

Albums

Studio albums

Live albums

Compilation albums

Box sets

The Bootleg Series

Singles

Notes

Billboard Year-End performances

Extended plays
These are notable EP releases, mostly containing exclusive non-album tracks. See discogs.com for more foreign EPs that mostly contain just album version tracks or are just domestic promotional album samplers.

Live EPs

Compilation EPs

Other appearances

Studio appearances as primary artist

Live appearances and remixes as primary artist

Contributions

Releases with The Traveling Wilburys

Albums

Other appearances

Compilations

Videography

Concert videos

Music videos

Other appearances 
Concerts
 Festival (1967)
 Johnny Cash! The Man, His World, His Music (1969)
 The Concert for Bangladesh (1972)
 Earl Scruggs: The Bluegrass Legend – Family & Friends (1972)
 The Last Waltz (1978)
 USA for Africa: We Are the World: The Video Event (1985)
 Live Aid (1985)
Bob Dylan: The 30th Anniversary Concert Celebration (1993) #40 U.S.
 Willie Nelson: The Big Six-0 (1993)
 Woodstock '94 (1995)
 Eric Clapton & Friends In Concert: A Benefit for the Crossroads Centre at Antigua (1999)
 Willie Nelson and Friends – Outlaws & Angels (2004)
Gotta Serve Somebody: The Gospel Songs of Bob Dylan DVD (2006)
The True History of the Traveling Wilburys DVD (2007)
TV performances
 Folk Songs and More Folk Songs (1963) (Westinghouse TV special) (two songs are on the special features of the No Direction Home DVD)
 March on Washington Broadcast (1963)
 Quest: The Times They Are A-Changin' (1964) (Canada, CBC TV special) (one song is on the special features of the No Direction Home DVD)
 The New Steve Allen Show (1964) (a.k.a. The Steve Allen Westinghouse Show)
 Tonight (1964) (BBC TV)
 Bob Dylan: Elston Gunn Live in Concert (1965) (BBC TV special) (audio only, video lost)
 The Johnny Cash Show (1969) (Episode 1: June 7) (DVD 2007, music videos 2019)
 Soundstage: The World of John Hammond (1975)
 Hard Rain (1976) (TV Special with Joan Baez)
 Saturday Night Live (1979) (DVD 2009)
 22nd Annual Grammy Awards (1980)
 Late Night with David Letterman (1984)
 An All-Star Celebration Honoring Martin Luther King Jr. (1986)
 33rd Annual Grammy Awards (1991)
 Late Show with David Letterman (1993)
 Mastercard Masters of Music Concert for the Prince's Trust (1996)
 40th Annual Grammy Awards (1998)
 73rd Academy Awards (2001)
 53rd Annual Grammy Awards (2011)
 Late Show with David Letterman (2015)

Film

Films 

 Eat the Document (1972)
 Renaldo and Clara (1978)

Performances 
 BBC Sunday-Night Play: The Madhouse on Castle Street (1963) (partial audio only, film lost)
 Pat Garrett & Billy the Kid (1973)
 Hearts of Fire (1987)
 Backtrack a.k.a. Catchfire (1990)
 Paradise Cove (1999)
 Masked and Anonymous (2003)
 Rolling Thunder Revue: A Bob Dylan Story by Martin Scorsese (2019)

Documentary appearances
 Dylan Speaks: The Legendary Press Conference in San Francisco (1965) (DVD 2006)
 Dont Look Back (1967)
 John & Yoko in Syracuse, New York (1972)
 Runaway America (1982)
 March on Washington: Commemoration of Martin Luther King's '63 March (1983)
 We Are The World: The Story Behind the Song (1985)
 Sun City: Artists United Against Apartheid (1985)
 Great Performances: Celebrating Gershwin: 'S Wonderful (1987)
 A Vision Shared – A Tribute to Woody Guthrie & Leadbelly (voice) (1988)
 Robbie Robertson: Going Home (1995)
 We Are the World: A 10th Anniversary Tribute (1995)
 The History of Rock 'n' Roll (1995)
 Biography: Richard Pryor: Comic on the Edge (1996)
 Biography: Bob Dylan: The American Troubadour (August 2000), directed by Stephen Crisman
 World Tour 1966: The Home Movies (2003)
 Apollo at 70: A Hot Night in Harlem (2004)
 No Direction Home (2005), directed by Martin Scorsese
 Concert for Bangladesh Revisited with George Harrison and Friends (2005)
 Bob Dylan 1975–1981: Rolling Thunder and the Gospel Years (2006)
 The Legend of Liam Clancy (2006)
 American Masters: Andy Warhol: A Documentary Film (2006)
 Pete Seeger: The Power of Song (2007)
 Tom Petty and the Heartbreakers: Runnin' Down a Dream (2007)
 65 Revisited (2007)
 Inside Bob Dylan's Jesus Years: Busy Being Born... Again! (2008)
 The Power of Their Song: The Untold Story of Latin America's New Song Movement (2008)
 Patti Smith: Dream of Life (2008)
 Johnny Cash's America (2008)
 Bob Dylan Never Ending Tour Diaries: Drummer Winston Watson's Incredible Journey (2009)
 American Masters: Joan Baez: How Sweet the Sound (2009)
 The People Speak (2009)
 Phil Ochs: There but for Fortune (2010)
 Bob Dylan Revealed (2011)
 Down in the Flood: Bob Dylan, The Band & The Basement Tapes (2012)
 The March (2013)
 Sweet Blues: A Film About Mike Bloomfield (2013)
 Born in Chicago (2014)
 Lost Songs: The Basement Tapes Continued (voice-over interview) (2014)
 The Basement Tapes: The Legendary Tale (2014)
 Mavis! (2015)
 Dylan on 'Dont Look Back''' (2015)
 Trouble No More: A Musical Film (2017)
 Odds and Ends (2021)

 Notes 

 References 

 Bibliography 
 [ "Album Chart History: Bob Dylan"] Billboard 200
 Björner, Olof, "Bob Dylan: Still on the Road: Recording SESSIONS"
 Heylin, Clinton, Bob Dylan: The Recording Sessions 1960–94. Penguin. UK; St Martin's Press, US, 1995. 
 Krogsgaard, Michael. Positively Bob Dylan: A Thirty Year Discography, Concert, and Recording Session Guide, 1960–1991''. Ann Arbor: Popular Culture, Ink., 1991.  (previously published in Europe by Scandinavian Society for Rock Research)

Discographies of American artists
Folk music discographies
Rock music discographies
 Discography